Polygonoideae is a subfamily of plants in the family Polygonaceae. It includes a number of plants that can be highly invasive, such as Japanese knotweed, Reynoutria japonica, and its hybrid with R. sachalinensis, R. × bohemica. Boundaries between the genera placed in the subfamily and their relationships have long been problematic, but a series of molecular phylogenetic studies have clarified some of them, resulting in the division of the subfamily into seven tribes.

Taxonomy

Phylogeny
A 2015 molecular phylogenetic study suggested that the genera and tribes in Polygonoideae were related as shown in the following cladogram.

Rumex included Emex, and Fallopia was not monophyletic, with some species placed outside the main group in the tribe Polygoneae, and some others grouping with Pteroxygonum, placed in the tribe Pteroxygoneae.

Genera
Some of the boundaries between the genera are not settled ; in particular, Fallopia is at least paraphyletic. A 2011 classification divided the subfamily into five tribes, Calligoneae, Fagopyreae, Persicariae, Polygoneae and Rumiceae, leaving some genera unplaced. A 2015 molecular phylogenetic study added two new tribes accommodating these genera, Oxygoneae and Pteroxygoneae. Genera and their tribal placement accepted in the 2015 study are shown below.

Tribe Calligoneae C.A.Mey
Calligonum
Pteropyrum
Tribe Fagopyreae Yonek.
Fagopyrum
Tribe Oxygoneae T.M.Schust. & Reveal
Oxygonum
Tribe Persicariae Dumort.
Bistorta
Koenigia
Persicaria
Tribe Polygoneae Rchb.
Atraphaxis
Duma
Fallopia
Knorringia
Muehlenbeckia
Polygonum
Reynoutria
Tribe Pteroxygoneae T.M.Schust. & Reveal
Pteroxygonum
Tribe Rumiceae Dumort.
Oxyria
Rheum
Rumex (including Emex)

Many species in the subfamily have at one time or another been placed in different genera; for example the invasive Japanese knotweed is currently in the genus Reynoutria, but has been in Polygonum and Fallopia.

References

 
Caryophyllales subfamilies